Chalcogenia elegans is a beetle species in the genus Chalcogenia.

References

External links

Buprestidae
Beetles described in 2008